Coptosia cinerascens is a species of beetle in the family Cerambycidae. It was described by Kraatz in 1882. It is known from Kazakhstan, Turkmenistan, Kyrgyzstan, Afghanistan, Tajikistan, and Uzbekistan.

References

Saperdini
Beetles described in 1882